Group 4 of the 1962 FIFA World Cup took place from 30 May to 7 June 1962. The group consisted of Argentina, Bulgaria, England, and Hungary.

Standings

Matches
All times listed are local time.

Argentina vs Bulgaria

Hungary vs England

England vs Argentina

Hungary vs Bulgaria

Hungary vs Argentina

England vs Bulgaria

References

External links
 1962 FIFA World Cup archive

1962 FIFA World Cup
Argentina at the 1962 FIFA World Cup
England at the 1962 FIFA World Cup
Hungary at the 1962 FIFA World Cup
Bulgaria at the 1962 FIFA World Cup